Macaduma postflavida is a moth of the subfamily Arctiinae. It was described by Rothschild in 1916. It is found on the Dampier Archipelago.

References

Macaduma
Moths described in 1916